King U-thong or King Ramathibodi I (1314–1369) was the first king of the kingdom Ayutthaya (now part of Thailand), reigning from 1351 to 1369. He was known as Prince U Thong (meaning "Golden Cradle") before he ascended to the throne in 1350.  There are many theories about Uthong's background, including possibly being a descendant of Mangrai.

According to a better-known source, a seventeenth-century account by Dutchman Jeremias Van Vliet, a Renowned Legend stated that Ramatibodi was an ethnic Chinese, having sailed down from China. After succeeding in trade, he became influential enough to rule the city of Phetchaburi, a coastal town of the Gulf of Thailand, before travelling up to Ayutthaya.

Ramathibodi I established four Great Officers of State.  These were the Ministry of the Interior (Wieng), the Ministry of the Treasury (Klang), the Ministry for the King's Household (Wang), and the Ministry of Agriculture (Na).  He also codified the T'ai laws.  Finally, he formed an alliance with the Ming Dynasty. 

He established his own capital in the new city of Ayutthaya.  King Ramathabodi's reign included Korat, Chantaburi, Tavoy, Tenasserim, and large parts of Malaya.

In 1352 he laid siege to Yasodharapura.  He was successful the following year and placed one of his sons on the throne.  However, they were only able to keep the throne until 1357, when the Khmers were able to regain it.  

King Ramathibodi's death sparked a conflict over succession. Initially, his son King Ramesuan became ruler of Ayutthaya, but King Ramesuan later abdicated in favor of King Ramathibodi's brother-in-law, King Borommaracha I.  This rivalry for the throne may have been peaceful or it may have been bloody.

References

Bibliography
Wyatt, David K., Thailand: A Short History, New Haven (Yale University), 2003.  
Srisak Vallipodom, Sheikh Ahmad Qomi and the History of Siam, Cultural Center of the Islamic City, Republic of Iran, Bangkok 1995, page 209
Plubplung Kongchana, The Persians in Ayutthaya, Institute of Asia Pacific Studies, Srinakharinwirot University.

See also
Lavo Kingdom
Ayutthaya Kingdom
History of Lopburi
Phetburi
Nakhon Thai

.
.
14th-century monarchs in Asia
Thai people of Chinese descent
1314 births
1369 deaths
14th-century Thai people
Founding monarchs